Xyliphius lepturus is a species of banjo catfish found in Colombia, Ecuador and Venezuela where it can be found in the upper Amazon and Orinoco River basins. It grows to a length of 13.2 cm.

References 
 

Aspredinidae
Catfish of South America
Freshwater fish of Ecuador
Freshwater fish of Colombia
Fish of Venezuela
Fish of the Amazon basin
Fish described in 1962